Civil disobedience is the active, professed refusal to obey certain laws, demands, and commands of a government, or of an occupying international power. 

Disobedience may also refer to:

 Disobedience (2003 film), a drama directed by Licínio Azevedo, starring Rosa Castigo
 Disobedience (novel), by Naomi Alderman
 Disobedience (2017 film), a film adaptation of the novel, directed by Sebastián Lelio and starring Rachel Weisz
 Disobedience: Chris T-T Sings A.A. Milne, a 2011 album from Chris T-T
 "Disobedience", a song by KMFDM from their 1995 album Nihil

See also
 Disobedient (disambiguation)
 Insubordination